is a passenger railway station  located in the city of Sakaiminato, Tottori Prefecture, Japan. It is operated by the West Japan Railway Company (JR West).

Lines
Only local trains stop at this station.

Station layout
There is no station building and the station is unattended.

History
Agarimichi Station opened on 1 July 1952.

Passenger statistics
In fiscal 2018, the station was used by an average of 356 passengers daily.

Surrounding area
Sakaiminato Civic Gymnasium
Tottori Prefectural Sakai High School

See also
List of railway stations in Japan

References

External links 

 0641709  Agarimichi Station from JR-Odekake.net 

Railway stations in Japan opened in 1952
Railway stations in Tottori Prefecture
Stations of West Japan Railway Company
Sakaiminato, Tottori

|